What the Stones Tell (German: Was Steine erzählen) is a 1925 German silent historical war film directed by Rolf Randolf and starring Ernst Rückert, Fritz Greiner and Eduard von Winterstein. The film portrays the Lützow Free Corps of the Napoleonic Era. Its title references a poem about the unit, and is part of the tradition of Prussian films.

The film's sets were designed by the famous art director Robert A. Dietrich.

Cast
 Ernst Rückert as Theodor Körner
 Fritz Greiner as Andreas Hofer 
 Eduard von Winterstein as General Wrangel
 Rudolf Hilberg as Major von Lützow
 Elise Aulinger as Hoferin 
 Karl Beckersachs as Lieutenant 
 Christian Bummerstaedt as Friedrich Förster 
 Theodor Loos
 Karl Platen
 Grete Reinwald

References

Bibliography
 Bock, Hans-Michael & Bergfelder, Tim. The Concise CineGraph. Encyclopedia of German Cinema. Berghahn Books, 2009.

External links

1925 films
Films of the Weimar Republic
Films directed by Rolf Randolf
German silent feature films
1920s historical films
German historical films
Films set in the 1810s
German war films
1925 war films
Prussian films
Napoleonic Wars films
German black-and-white films
1920s German films